Sonepur (Sl. No.: 65) is a Vidhan Sabha constituency of Subarnapur district, Odisha.

This constituency includes Sonepur, Tarbha, Sonepur block, Tarbha block, Dunguripali block and two GPs (Julunda and Mahada) of Binika block.

Elected Members

Fifteen elections were held between 1951 and 2014. Elected members from the Sonepur constituency are:
2014: (65): Niranjan Pujari (BJD)
2009: (65): Niranjan Pujari (BJD)
2004: (112): Binod Patra (Congress)
2000: (112): Kunduru Kushal (BJD)
1995: (112): Kunduru Kushal (Janata Dal)
1990: (112): Kunduru Kushal (Janata Dal)
1985: (112): Achyuta Biswal (Congress)
1980: (112): Dhaneswar Kumbhar (Congress-I)
1977: (112): Debraj Seth (Janata Party)
1974: (112): Daulat Bagh (Swatantra)
1971: (100): Nilambar Raiguru (Swatantra)
1967: (100): Nilambar Raiguru (Swatantra)
1961: (49): Daulat Panda (Ganatantra Parishad)
1957: (34): Anantaram Nanda (Ganatantra Parishad)
1951: (25): Anantaram Nanda (Ganatantra Parishad)

2019 Election Result
In 2019 election:

2014 Election Result
In 2014 election, Biju Janata Dal candidate Niranjan Pujari defeated Bharatiya Janata Party candidate Pramod Kumar Mahapatra by a margin of 51,485 votes.

2009 Election Result
In 2009 election, Biju Janata Dal candidate Niranjan Pujari defeated Bharatiya Janata Party candidate Nabakrushna Danta by a margin of 28,307 votes.

Notes

References

Assembly constituencies of Odisha
Subarnapur district